Adichanalloor  is a village and grama panchayat in Kollam district in the state of Kerala, India.

General
 India census, Adichanalloor had a population of 27767 with 12980 males and 14787 females.

References

External links
http://wikimapia.org/11093702/Sanathana-Eye-Hospital-Adichanalloor-Kollam

Villages in Kollam district